Sons Creek is a stream in Dade County in the U.S. state of Missouri. It is a tributary of the Sac River within Stockton Lake.

Sons Creek has the name of one Mr. Son, a pioneer who settled there in the 1820s.

See also
List of rivers of Missouri

References

Rivers of Dade County, Missouri
Rivers of Missouri